Saint-Camille may refer to one of two places in Canada:

Saint-Camille, a township in Quebec
Saint-Camille-de-Lellis, Quebec, a parish in Quebec

or a place in Burkina Faso:
Saint-Camille, Burkina Faso in Doumbala Department

See also
Saint Camille Association